The Metropolitan League is a 21 club cross country running league in South East England. There are five league fixtures held in various locations between October and February. Male and female athletes aged 11 upwards compete at each fixture and there are six races which are categorised as:
- under 13 boys
- under 13 girls
- combined under 15 boys and under 17 men
- combined under 15 girls and under 17 women
- combined senior women and veteran women
- senior men and veteran men.

The senior and veterans races also include divisions one, two and three.

The league as a whole is arguably the largest in numbers in the UK, after the North Eastern Harrier League.

History
The league was founded on 23 March 1966 when eight of the major London athletic clubs met at the Primrose public house in Bishopsgate to discuss cross country competition. All clubs signed up and the first fixture was held in October that year at Hainault Forest. Nine clubs entered over 260 athletes in the two races: one for seniors and juniors, the other for youths and boys. For the first five years there were only four matches per season but this expanded to five in 1971.

Sponsorship
The league was sponsored by the athletics retailer London City Runner until 2013, when the events promoter Active Training World took the rights. Start Fitness is the current sponsor.

Competition format
Athletes are awarded points dependent on their finishing position in the race: the higher the position, the more points accrued. For senior men, the total points from the top 12 athletes at a club make up their 'A' team score. The next 12 athletes to finish at that club (i.e. positions 13–24) count towards the 'B' team. For senior women only six athletes make up a team.

At the end of the season, the team with the most points is declared the champion.

Independent runners are allowed to run for a small surcharge.

Race venues
The five venues are decided before the start of every season and are chosen from Alexandra Palace, Chingford, Claybury, Cranford, Hainault Forest, Hilly Fields (Enfield), Horsenden Hill, Parliament Hill, Ruislip, St Albans, Stevenage, Trent Park, Welwyn Garden City and Wormwood Scrubs.

Clubs
There are ten clubs in Divisions One and Two with larger numbers in Division Three in the senior women and senior and veteran men categories. Larger clubs enter up to three teams of runners into the league, while smaller clubs only enter one.

Below are tables showing teams in each league from 2015 to 2016. Bracketed numbers are numbers of scorers per team in that league.

Senior women

Veteran women

Senior men

Veteran men

Honours

Clubs
Since 1966, Thames Valley Harriers have won the most men's titles, a total of 33. Since 1994, Highgate Harriers have been the most successful women's club, winning the trophy on 21 occasions.

Athletes
Julian Gentry of Newham and Essex Beagles holds the most individual titles, a total of eight. These were won consecutively from 1989 to 1996. Svenja Abel (Highgate Harriers) has won the women's title four times, in 2004, 2006, 2009 and 2010.

References

Cross country running competitions
Cross country running in the United Kingdom
Sport in London